The 11th season of Taniec z Gwiazdami, the Polish edition of Dancing With the Stars, started on March 7, 2010 and ended on June 13, 2010. It was broadcast by TVN. Katarzyna Skrzynecka and Piotr Gąsowski continued as the hosts, and the judges were: Iwona Szymańska-Pavlović, Zbigniew Wodecki, Beata Tyszkiewicz and Piotr Galiński.

Couples

Scores

Red numbers indicate the lowest score for each week.
Green numbers indicate the highest score for each week.
 indicates the couple eliminated that week.
 indicates the returning couple that finished in the bottom two.
 indicates the winning couple of the week.
 indicates the runner-up of the week.
 indicates the third place couple of the week.
 indicates the couple withdrew from the competition.
 indicates the couple that would have been eliminated had an elimination taken place.

 Because of Oceana's withdrawal there was no elimination in Week 8. Week 9 featured a combined score of both Week 8 and Week 9.

Notes:

Week 1: Oceana scored 37 out of 40 on her first dance (Cha Cha Cha). Although Katarzyna Skrzynecka (the host) claimed it was the highest score ever in Week 1, the actual record belongs to Natasza Urbańska who scored 38 on her Cha Cha Cha in Week 1 of Season 10. There was, however, a record in this episode: Łukasz Mróz got the lowest score in history of the show, scoring 15 out of 40 for his Cha Cha Cha. Iga Wyrwał also got 15 points for her Jive in Week 3 Season 10. There was no elimination this week.

Week 2: Katarzyna Glinka scored 39 out of 40 for her Quickstep, making it the highest Week 2 score in history of the show. Łukasz Mróz made the biggest weekly improvement in history of the show, after scoring 15 points in Week 1 and then 36 points in Week 2. Przemysław Saleta got 22 points for his Rumba, making it the lowest score of the week. Przemysław & Magdalena were eliminated.

Week 3: Katarzyna Glinka received the first perfect score of the season as well as the earliest perfect score in history of the show. Only Mateusz Damięcki, Agata Kulesza, Alan Andersz, Dorota Gardias-Skóra, Anna Mucha and Natasza Urbańska have scored 40 points in Week 3. Przemysław Saleta got 19 points for his Tango, making it the lowest score of the week. Łukasz & Aneta were eliminated despite being 14 points from the bottom.

Week 4: Julia Kamińska & Aleksandra Szwed got their first perfect scores for the Paso Doble. Przemysław Saleta got 20 points for his Paso Doble, making it the lowest score of the week. Przemysław & Izabela were on the bottom of the leaderboard for the third consecutive week. Przemysław & Izabela were eliminated.

Week 5: Julia Kamińska received her second perfect score for the Viennese Waltz and Oceana received her first perfect score for the Samba. Maciej Friedek got 28 points for his Viennese Waltz, making it the lowest score of the week. Aleksandra & Robert were eliminated despite being 6 points from the bottom.

Week 6: Olga Bołądź received her first perfect score for the Waltz in American Smooth. There was a three-way tie on the second place, with Julia Kamińska, Oceana and Piotr Szwedes all getting 39 out of 40. Katarzyna Grochola got 27 points for her Salsa, making it the lowest score of the week. Oceana announced that she was pregnant, but she decided to continue with participating in the show, having no contraindications to dance. Maciej and Blanka were eliminated despite being 9 points from the bottom.

Week 7: All couples danced to songs from famous movies about dance. Julia Kamińska, Katarzyna Glinka, Olga Bołądź and Oceana all received perfect scores for their dances making a four-way tie on the first place and making it the first episode ever with four celebrities all scoring 40 out of 40. Katarzyna Grochola got 23 points for her Cha-cha-cha, making it the lowest score of the week. Piotr & Anna were eliminated according to a combined jury and audience voting, but Artur & Paulina left the show because of Artur's injury, putting Piotr & Anna back into the competition.

Week 8: All couples danced to the most famous songs of the rock band Queen. Katarzyna Glinka got perfect score for her Rumba. Katarzyna Grochola got 21 points for her Jive, making it the lowest score of the week. Because of an ankle injury, Julia Kamińska had to dance in flat shoes starting from this week until the end of the competition. Oceana's dance was scheduled the last one, but instead of dancing, the singer announced her withdrawal from the show, planning to focus on her pregnancy. She was moved by a standing ovation of the audience and the jury and decided to sing one of her songs. Because of Oceana's withdrawal, there was no elimination this week and the scores were added to the next week ones creating a combined Week 8&9 score. This week marks the first time in history of the show when two celebrities withdrew from the show in two consecutive weeks.

Week 9: All couples danced to songs from famous musicals. Katarzyna Glinka got two perfect scores for her Paso Doble and Foxtrot, having scored 4 perfect scores in a row. Katarzyna & Jan were on the bottom of the leaderboard for the fourth consecutive week. Piotr & Anna were eliminated.

Week 10: Julia Kamińska got two perfect scores for her Waltz and Samba. Katarzyna Grochola got her first and only perfect score for the Tango that moved the audience and judges. Olga & Łukasz were eliminated despite being 10 points from the bottom.

Week 11: Katarzyna Glinka got two perfect scores for her Rumba and Viennese Waltz. Julia Kamińska was in the bottom two for the first time in the competition. Katarzyna & Jan were eliminated.

Week 12: Both Julia Kamińska and Katarzyna Glinka got 120 out of 120 points, making it the third-season finale in a row with both couples getting the highest possible score. Both couples had to perform three dances: their favorite Latin dance, their favorite Ballroom dance and a Freestyle. Although Katarzyna Glinka had a bigger number of audience votes after the first and second round, the eventual winners were Julia Kamińska and Rafał Maserak, having cast 50.88 percent of the votes. This was Rafał Maserak's second win in a row since he won the 10th season with his celebrity partner Anna Mucha. This is the third time the season's winner was on the third place on the judges' general scoreboard and the fifth time the winner was not on the first place according to the judges' scoreboard.

Special stars

Average chart

Average dance chart

Highest and lowest scoring performances
The best and worst performances in each dance according to the judges' marks are as follows:

The Best Score (40)

Episodes

Week 1
Individual judges scores in charts below (given in parentheses) are listed in this order from left to right: Iwona Szymańska-Pavlović, Zbigniew Wodecki, Beata Tyszkiewicz and Piotr Galiński.

Running order

Week 2
Individual judges scores in charts below (given in parentheses) are listed in this order from left to right: Iwona Szymańska-Pavlović, Zbigniew Wodecki, Beata Tyszkiewicz and Piotr Galiński.

Running order

Week 3
Individual judges scores in charts below (given in parentheses) are listed in this order from left to right: Iwona Szymańska-Pavlović, Zbigniew Wodecki, Beata Tyszkiewicz and Piotr Galiński.

Running order

Week 4
Individual judges scores in charts below (given in parentheses) are listed in this order from left to right: Iwona Szymańska-Pavlović, Zbigniew Wodecki, Beata Tyszkiewicz and Piotr Galiński.

Running order

Week 5
Individual judges scores in charts below (given in parentheses) are listed in this order from left to right: Iwona Szymańska-Pavlović, Zbigniew Wodecki, Beata Tyszkiewicz and Piotr Galiński.

Running order

Week 6
Individual judges scores in charts below (given in parentheses) are listed in this order from left to right: Iwona Szymańska-Pavlović, Zbigniew Wodecki, Beata Tyszkiewicz and Piotr Galiński.

Running order

Week 7: Dance Movies Themes Week
Individual judges scores in charts below (given in parentheses) are listed in this order from left to right: Iwona Szymańska-Pavlović, Zbigniew Wodecki, Beata Tyszkiewicz and Piotr Galiński.

Running order

Week 8: Queen Week
Individual judges scores in charts below (given in parentheses) are listed in this order from left to right: Iwona Szymańska-Pavlović, Zbigniew Wodecki, Beata Tyszkiewicz and Piotr Galiński.

Running order

Week 9: Musical Theme Week
Individual judges scores in charts below (given in parentheses) are listed in this order from left to right: Iwona Szymańska-Pavlović, Zbigniew Wodecki, Beata Tyszkiewicz and Piotr Galiński.

Running order

Week 10
Individual judges scores in charts below (given in parentheses) are listed in this order from left to right: Iwona Szymańska-Pavlović, Zbigniew Wodecki, Beata Tyszkiewicz and Piotr Galiński.

Running order

Week 11
Individual judges scores in charts below (given in parentheses) are listed in this order from left to right: Iwona Szymańska-Pavlović, Zbigniew Wodecki, Beata Tyszkiewicz and Piotr Galiński.

Running order

Week 12: Final
Individual judges scores in charts below (given in parentheses) are listed in this order from left to right: Iwona Szymańska-Pavlović, Zbigniew Wodecki, Beata Tyszkiewicz and Piotr Galiński.

Running order

Another Dances

Dance Schedule
The celebrities and professional partners danced one of these routines for each corresponding week.
 Week 1: Cha-Cha-Cha or Waltz
 Week 2: Rumba or Quickstep
 Week 3: Jive or Tango
 Week 4: Paso Doble or Foxtrot
 Week 5: Samba or Viennese Waltz
 Week 6: Salsa or Waltz in American Smooth
 Week 7: One unlearned dance (Dance Movies Week)
 Week 8: One unlearned dance & Group Viennese Waltz (Queen Week)
 Week 9: One unlearned & one repeated dance (Musicals Week)
 Week 10: One unlearned Latin dance & one repeated Ballroom dance
 Week 11: Final unlearned Ballroom dance & one repeated Latin dance
 Week 12: Favorite Latin dance, favorite Ballroom dance & Freestyle

Dance Chart

 Highest scoring dance
 Lowest scoring dance
 Performed, but not scored
 Not performed due to withdrawal

Episode results

 This couple came in first place with the judges.
 This couple came in first place with the judges and gained the highest number of viewers' votes.
 This couple gained the highest number of viewers' votes.
 This couple came in last place with the judges.
 This couple came in last place with the judges and was eliminated.
 This couple was eliminated.
 This couple withdrew from the competition.
 This couple would have been eliminated but was not eliminated due to other couple's withdrawal.
 This couple won the competition.
 This couple came in second in the competition.
 This couple came in third in the competition.

Audience voting results
The percentage of votes cast by a couple in a particular week is given in parentheses.

Rating Figures

External links
 Official Site – Taniec z gwiazdami
 Taniec z gwiazdami on Polish Wikipedia

References

Season 11
2010 Polish television seasons